The Dreiländerspitze is one of the higher mountains in the Silvretta range in the eastern Alps, at 3,197 metres. The borders of Graubünden (Switzerland), Vorarlberg (Austria) and Tyrol (Austria) meet at the peak. Its name (Dreiländerspitze means peak of three countries) refers to a meeting point between the territories of three ancient tribes (Rhaeto-Romance or Romansch, Bavarii and Alamanni) and their languages. It is also on the watershed between the Rhine and Danube. It is a favourite viewpoint, due to its position and accessibility. Its first documented ascent was by the German alpinist Theodor Petersen, accompanied by two locals, on 14 July 1870, although it appeared to have been previously climbed by surveyors in the 1850s. The nearest settlements are Galtür, 14 km to the north, and Guarda, 9 km to the south.

References

External links
Dreiländerspitze on Hikr

Mountains of Graubünden
Mountains of Tyrol (state)
Mountains of Vorarlberg
Mountains of the Alps
Scuol
Alpine three-thousanders
Mountains of Switzerland
Silvretta Alps
Austria–Switzerland border